Konstantinos Tegousis (born 8 August 1991) is a Greek professional footballer who plays as a midfielder for Super League 2 club Panachaiki.

References

1991 births
Living people
Greek footballers
Football League (Greece) players
Gamma Ethniki players
Egaleo F.C. players
Kallithea F.C. players
Proodeftiki F.C. players
Fostiras F.C. players
Trikala F.C. players
Ethnikos Piraeus F.C. players
Association football midfielders
Footballers from Agrinio